The 2017–18 Texas–Rio Grande Valley Vaqueros men's basketball team represented the University of Texas Rio Grande Valley during the 2017–18 NCAA Division I men's basketball season. The Vaqueros, led by second-year head coach Lew Hill, played their home games at the UTRGV Fieldhouse as members of the Western Athletic Conference. They finished the season 15–18, 6–8 in WAC play to finish in fifth place. They lost in the quarterfinals of the WAC tournament to Seattle. They were invited to the College Basketball Invitational where they lost in the first round to New Orleans.

Previous season 
The Vaqueros finished the 2016–17 season 10–22, 2–12 in WAC play to finish in seventh place. Due to Grand Canyon's ineligibility for postseason play, they received the No. 6 seed in the WAC tournament where they lost in the quarterfinals to UMKC.

Offseason

Departures

Incoming transfers

2017 incoming recruits

Roster

Schedule and results 

|-
!colspan=9 style=| Regular season

|-
!colspan=9 style=| WAC tournament

|-
!colspan=9 style=| CBI

See also 
 2017–18 Texas–Rio Grande Valley Vaqueros women's basketball team

References 

UT Rio Grande Valley Vaqueros men's basketball seasons
Texas-Rio Grande
Texas-Rio Grande